Christian Hayden (born 26 March 1994) is an Austrian footballer who currently plays for SK Austria Klagenfurt.

External links
 

Austrian footballers
Austrian Football Bundesliga players
SV Grödig players
SKN St. Pölten players
1994 births
Living people
Association football defenders